No Place to Hide may  refer to:

Film, television and radio
 No Place to Hide (1956 film)
 No Place to Hide (1973 film) or Rebel
 No Place to Hide (1981 film), a TV film
 No Place to Hide (1993 film), a film with Kris Kristofferson
 "No Place to Hide" (Lost in Space), the 1965 pilot episode of Lost in Space
 "No Place to Hide" (ER), an episode of ER
 "No Place to Hide", a 1959 episode of The DuPont Show with June Allyson
 No Place to Hide, a South African science-fiction serial drama running on Springbok Radio from 1958 to 1970

Literature
 No Place to Hide (Bradley book), a 1948 book on nuclear fallout by David J. Bradley
 No Place to Hide (Greenwald book), a 2014 book by Glenn Greenwald
 No Place to Hide, a 2005 book by Robert O'Harrow, Jr., featured on The Daily Show in 2006

Music

Albums
No Place To Hide, a 1981 album by Gail Zeiler
No Place to Hide, a 2002 jazz album by Ron Eschete and Mort Weiss

Songs
 "No Place to Hide" (song), a 1996 song by Korn
"No Place To Hide", a song by Ash first released as the B-side to "There's A Star"
"No Place To Hide", a 1985 song by The Cynics
"No Place to Hide", a 2002 song by Forgotten Rebels
"No Place to Hide" or "Wudi Zirong", a song by Heibao from Heibao
"(There's) No Place To Hide", a song by Ben E. King first released on What Is Soul
"No Place to Hide", a song by Alison Krauss & Union Station from So Long So Wrong
"No Place to Hide", a song by Sérgio Mendes from Brasil '86
"No Place to Hide", a song by Declan O'Rourke from Since Kyabram 
"No Place to Hide", a song by Parlotones from Radiocontrolledrobot
"No Place to Hide", a 2010 song by Winfield's Locket

See also
 Nowhere to Hide (disambiguation)